Stewart McKimmie (born 27 October 1962) is a Scottish former professional footballer, who predominantly played for home town club Aberdeen. He played in defence, primarily as a right-back, and also played for Dundee and Dundee United. He later wrote a weekly column in the Evening Express, as well as appearing as a pundit on Northsound 2's Friday Sport.

Club career
McKimmie signed for hometown club Aberdeen in 1983 from Dundee, as a replacement for Stuart Kennedy who had been forced to retire due to injury. He won the European Super Cup shortly after joining, and would go on to win two Scottish League Championships in 1984 and 1985, three Scottish Cups in 1984, 1986 and 1990 and three Scottish League Cups in 1985, 1989 and the last in 1995, as captain of the club, in addition to involvement in several further runners-up finishes in the Premier Division and losing cup finals. He left Aberdeen in 1997, having made 561 appearances for the Dons in all competitions, and finished his career with Dundee United.

International career
He won 40 international caps for Scotland, appearing in the 1990 World Cup, the 1992 European Football Championship and 1996 European Football Championship. He scored once for Scotland, the only goal in a friendly game against world champions Argentina prior to the 1990 World Cup.

Career statistics

Club

International 

Scores and results list Scotland's goal tally first, score column indicates score after each McKimmie goal

Honours
 Scottish Premier League: 1983–84, 1984–85 
 Scottish Cup: 1983–84, 1985–86, 1989–90
 Scottish League Cup: 1985–86, 1989–90, 1995–96
 European Super Cup: 1983

See also
 List of footballers in Scotland by number of league appearances (500+)

References

External links
Evening Express column

1962 births
Scottish footballers
Aberdeen F.C. players
Dundee F.C. players
Dundee United F.C. players
Scotland international footballers
Scotland B international footballers
Living people
1990 FIFA World Cup players
UEFA Euro 1992 players
UEFA Euro 1996 players
Banks O' Dee F.C. players
Scottish Junior Football Association players
Scottish Football League players
Association football fullbacks
Scotland under-21 international footballers